Sunil-Kumar Sipaeya (born 4 April 1983) is an Indian former professional tennis player.

A left-handed player from Kapurthala, Sipaeya was a national hardcourt champion as a 16-year old in 1999 and made the junior doubles quarter-finals of the 2001 Wimbledon Championships.

Sipaeya represented India at the 2002 Asian Games and was a doubles silver-medalist at the 2003 Afro-Asian Games.

His career best singles ranking of 340 was attained in 2005 and he won two ITF Futures singles titles during his career. As a doubles player he was ranked as high as 296 in the world and won a further 15 ITF tournaments.

In 2007 he made his only Davis Cup appearance for India, as the doubles partner of Leander Paes in a tie against Uzbekistan. He and Paes were victorious in five sets, over Farrukh Dustov and Denis Istomin.

See also
List of India Davis Cup team representatives

References

External links
 
 
 

1983 births
Living people
Indian male tennis players
Tennis players at the 2002 Asian Games
People from Kapurthala
Asian Games competitors for India